William P. Doyle is the former Commissioner of the Federal Maritime Commission.  Commissioner Doyle was unanimously confirmed by the U.S. Senate in 2013 and 2015 after being nominated twice by President Barack Obama.  He stayed on with the Commission under the administration of Donald J. Trump during the first year of President Trump’s term.  In January 2018, Mr. Doyle became the Chief Executive Officer and Executive Director of the Dredging Contractors of America.  On July 22, 2020, Mr. Doyle was appointed by Maryland Governor Larry Hogan as the Executive Director of the Maryland Port Administration where he serves as the chief executive of the Helen Delich Bentley Port of Baltimore.

Early life
Commissioner Doyle was born in Boston, Massachusetts and raised in Weymouth. He is a 1992 graduate of the Massachusetts Maritime Academy, where he earned a Bachelor of Science in Marine Engineering. During Operations Desert Shield and Desert Storm he worked in a shipyard breaking out vessels. After graduation from the Massachusetts Maritime Academy he served as an officer in the U.S. Merchant Marine from 1992 to 2002. He is a 2000 graduate of Widener University Commonwealth Law School.

Family Life
William currently resides in Pennsylvania. He has three children (in order) Lillian, William "Billy", and Katherine. His wife is Amy Wolfson Doyle an attorney. He also has a family dog named Gronk.

Public Service
In 2008 and until 2011, Mr. Doyle was appointed under the George W. Bush Administration as the Director of Permits, Scheduling & Compliance for the Office of Federal Coordinator for Alaska Natural Gas Transportation Projects. In 2013, the United States Senate confirmed President Barack Obama’s nomination of Mr. Doyle as a Commissioner of the Federal Maritime Commission. In 2015, Commissioner Doyle was unanimously confirmed by the Senate to a second term. Commissioner Doyle departed the Federal Maritime Commission in 2018 to become CEO and Executive Director of the Dredging Contractors of America.

References

Widener University Commonwealth Law School alumni
Massachusetts Maritime Academy alumni
Federal Maritime Commission members
Living people
21st-century American politicians
Year of birth missing (living people)
Obama administration personnel
Trump administration personnel